John Harold Strachan  (8 March 1896 – 1 December 1988) was an English first-class cricketer and British Army officer.

The son of Walter Strachan, he was born at Walton-on-Thames in March 1896, and was educated at Charterhouse School. His final year at Charterhouse coincided with the start of the First World War, and when he left he enlisted in the King's Own Scottish Borderers as a second lieutenant in March 1915. He was promoted to the rank of lieutenant in May 1917, antedated to July 1916. He was awarded the Military Cross for conspicuous gallantry and devotion to duty. He later played a single first-class cricket match for the Free Foresters against Cambridge University at Fenner's in 1926. Batting twice in the match, he was dismissed without scoring by Leonard Irvine, while in their second-innings he was promoted up the order to open, scoring 53 runs before being dismissed by the same bowler. He later emigrated to Canada, where he died in December 1988 at Collingwood, Ontario.

References

External links

1896 births
1988 deaths
People from Walton-on-Thames
People educated at Charterhouse School
King's Own Scottish Borderers officers
British Army personnel of World War I
Recipients of the Military Cross
English cricketers
Free Foresters cricketers
English emigrants to Canada
Canadian expatriate sportspeople in England